Synanthedon sequoiae, the sequoia pitch moth, is a moth of the family Sesiidae. It is found from California north to British Columbia.

Adults are on wing from May to early September.

The larvae feed on various conifer species, including Douglas fir, pines and spruces. The larvae are dirty white, grayish or pink. They excavate a shallow cavity that penetrates the inner bark to the cambium surface of the wood. Pupation takes place in a dark brown pupa that is made in a silk-lined chamber within the pitch mass. Most individuals require two years to develop from egg to adult.

The main effect of larval feeding is the production of large amounts of resin by the infected plants. Larval feeding sometimes causes one or more limbs to die or become weak enough to break, especially if infested trees are young.

References

External links
Bug Guide
mothphotographersgroup

Sesiidae
Moths described in 1881